New Brunswick is the eighth-most populous province in Canada, with 775,610 residents as of the 2021 census, and the third-smallest province by land area, at .

Municipalities in New Brunswick may be incorporated under the Municipalities Act of 1973 as a city, town, village, regional municipality, or rural community. Municipal governments are led by elected councils and are responsible for the delivery of services such as civic administration, land use planning, emergency measures, policing, road, and garbage collection. New Brunswick has 8 cities, 26 towns, 61 villages, 1 regional municipality, and 8 rural communities. Although rural communities are under the Municipalities Act, the provincial government distinguishes them from municipalities.

In 1785, Saint John became the first community in what would eventually become Canada to be incorporated as a city. Approximately one-third of the residents of New Brunswick do not live in municipalities but reside in local service districts, which are unincorporated communities administered by the Minister of Environment and Local Government and have no local government of their own.

Beginning in 2021, the government of New Brunswick launched the 2023 New Brunswick local governance reform, which saw the local service districts dissolved, with their territory assigned to cities, towns, villages, incorporated rural communities or rural districts.

Cities 

The Lieutenant-Governor in Council may incorporate an area as a city under the Local Governance Act if it has a population of at least 10,000. Cities already in existence on January 1, 1967 continue to be incorporated regardless of population. New Brunswick had eight cities that had a cumulative population of 293,928 in the 2021 Census. Moncton is New Brunswick's largest city by population with 79,470 residents and Saint John is the largest by land area  respectively.

Towns 
The Lieutenant-Governor in Council may incorporate an area as a town under the Local Governance Act if it has a population of at least 1,500 and provides a level of services that the Minister of Local Government and Local Governance Reform considers appropriate. Towns already in existence on January 1, 1967 continue to be incorporated regardless of population.

Prior to implementation of the 2023 local governance reforms, New Brunswick had 26 towns that had a cumulative population of 133,350 in the 2021 Census. The number of towns increased to 30 in 2023 upon implementation of the local governance reforms.

Villages 
Prior to implementation of the 2023 local governance reforms, New Brunswick's 61 villages had a cumulative population of 71,186 as of the 2021 Census. The number of villages decreased to 21 in 2023 upon implementation of the local governance reforms.

Regional municipalities 
The Lieutenant-Governor in Council may incorporate an area as a regional municipality under the Local Governance Act if there is a population of at least 15,000 and at least one existing municipality. New Brunswick's first and only regional municipality was incorporated on May 12, 2014. The Regional Municipality of Tracadie was formed through the amalgamation of the former Town of Tracadie–Sheila, eighteen local service districts and portions of two other local service districts. Regional municipalities must have a population greater than 15,000 and a community grouping that includes at least one municipality. Regional municipalities elect a local council but are responsible only for community administration, planning and emergency measures services, and all services previously provided by any former municipality that is now part of the regional municipality. The Province of New Brunswick is responsible for police protection and road services, unless the regional municipality chooses to assume these responsibilities.

Rural communities 
Prior to implementation of the 2023 local governance reforms, New Brunswick had eight rural communities that had a cumulative population of 24,842 in the 2021 Census. New Brunswick's largest and smallest rural communities were Beaubassin East and Campobello Island with populations of 6,718 and 949 respectively. The number of rural communities increased to seventeen in 2023 upon implementation of the local governance reforms.

Rural communities elect local councils and are responsible for the delivery of some local services, including administrative services, community planning and emergency measures. The province of New Brunswick ensures the delivery of other services including solid waste collection and recreation services unless the rural community chooses to take on these responsibilities. Rural communities that include a former village or town are an exception, as they are responsible to provide all services that were previously provided by their former municipality.

List of municipalities

See also 

2023 New Brunswick local governance reform
Demographics of New Brunswick
Geography of New Brunswick
List of census agglomerations in Atlantic Canada
List of communities in New Brunswick
List of designated places in New Brunswick
List of local service districts in New Brunswick
List of municipal amalgamations in New Brunswick 
List of parishes in New Brunswick
List of population centres in New Brunswick
New Brunswick municipal elections, 2016

Notes

References

External links 
New Brunswick Environment and Local Government Publications

Lists of populated places in New Brunswick